The 2018 Viterra Saskatchewan Scotties Tournament of Hearts, the provincial women's curling championship for Saskatchewan, was held from January 2–7 at the Northern Lights Palace in Melfort, Saskatchewan. The winning Sherry Anderson team represented Saskatchewan at the 2018 Scotties Tournament of Hearts.

Candace Chisholm, skip of the Chisholm rink won the Marj Mitchell Award for sportsmanship and competitiveness.

Qualification Process
 

 Nancy Martin Is Playing In  The Mixed Doubles Trials She Will Be Replaced By Taryn Schactel

Teams

The teams are listed as follows:

Round robin standings

Round Robin Results

Draw 1
Tuesday, January 2, 2:00

Draw 2
Tuesday, January 2, 7:30

Draw 3
January 3, 11:00am

Draw 4
January 3, 4:00pm

Draw 5
January 3, 9:00pm

Draw 6
January 4, 3:00pm

Draw 7
January 4, 8:30pm

Draw 8
January 5, 3:00pm

Draw 9
January 5, 8:30pm

Tiebreaker
January 6, 2:00pm

Playoffs

1 vs. 2
January 6, 8:00pm

3 vs. 4
January 6, 8:00pm

Semifinal
January 7, 1:00pm

Final
January 7, 5:00pm

References

Saskatchewan Scotties Tournament of Hearts
2018 in Saskatchewan
January 2018 sports events in Canada
Curling in Saskatchewan